Anisomeria is a genus of plants in the Phytolaccaceae family containing three species, Anisomeria bistrata, Anisomeria coriacea, and Anisomeria littoralis.

References

Phytolaccaceae
Caryophyllales genera